The Linda and Jack Gill Heart Institute at the University of Kentucky is housed at the Chandler Medical Center along Rose Street. Opened in 2004, the five-level . structure houses clinics, diagnostic areas, six Cath and EP laboratories with associated support services and numerous administrative and faculty offices. It will also house, in the future, the University of Kentucky Hospital Center for Advanced Surgery that will include waiting areas, pre-operative and post-operative preparatory and recovery rooms and eight operating rooms.

The building is attached to the University of Kentucky Critical Care Unit and is across from the Charles T. Wethington Jr. Building.

The goals of the center are,

Construction is expected to begin on the completion of the shell space on May 4, 2007, at a cost of $6.5 million.

See also
 Buildings at the University of Kentucky
 Cityscape of Lexington, Kentucky
 University of Kentucky

References

External links
 Linda and Jack Gill Heart Institute at the University of Kentucky Campus Guide
 Linda and Jack Gill Heart Institute

Buildings at the University of Kentucky